General Wright may refer to:

Ambrose R. Wright (1826–1872), Confederate general in the American Civil War
Archibald Wright (British Army officer) (1851–1943), British Army brigadier general
Bruce A. Wright (born c. 1951), U.S. Air Force lieutenant general
Edwin Kennedy Wright (1898–1983), U.S. Army major general
George Wright (general) (1803–1865), Union Army general in the American Civil War
Horatio Wright (1820–1899), Union Army general in the American Civil War
John M. Wright (1916–2014)m U.S. Army Force lieutenant general
Marcus Joseph Wright (1831–1922), Confederate general in the American Civil War
Raymond R. Wright (USMC) (1892–1964), U.S. Marine Corps major general
Roland R. Wright (1919–2015), U.S. Air Force brigadier general
Stuart P. Wright (1903-1982), U.S. Army Air Force major general
Thomas Charles Wright (1799–1868), Ecuadorian Army general
Wallace Duffield Wright (1875–1953), British Army brigadier general
William M. Wright (1863–1943), United States Army general in World War I
William Purvis Wright (1846–1910), Royal Marines general